Seocho-dong is a dong, or neighborhood of the greater Gangnam area Seocho-gu district of the South Korean city of Seoul. Seocho-dong is divided into 4 different dong which are Seocho 1-dong, 2-dong, 3-dong and 4-dong. The main street is Teheranno. There is Gangnam Station in Seocho-dong, which is one of the biggest stations in Korea.

Education 
 Universities
 Seoul National University of Education
 High Schools
 Seocho High School
 Seoul High School
 Yangjae High School
 Middle Schools
 Seocho Middle School
 Seoil Middle School
 Seoun Middle School
 Yeongdong Middle School
 Elementary Schools
 The Elementary School attached to Seoul National University of Education
 Seocho Elementary School
 Seoil Elementary School
 Wonmyeong Elementary School
 Seoi Elementary School
 Sinjung Elementary School

Transportation
 Seocho Station of 
 Nambu Bus Terminal Station of 

See also 
Administrative divisions of South Korea

References

External links
Seocho-gu official website
lifeinkorea.com
Seocho-gu map at the Seocho-gu official website
 The Seocho 1-dong Resident office

Neighbourhoods of Seocho District